Han Na-lae (born 6 July 1992) is a South Korean tennis player.

Han has a career-high singles ranking of 149, achieved June 2019. She reached the top 100 in doubles for the first time with a ranking of 96, on 31 October 2022.

Career
Han made her WTA Tour main-draw singles debut at the 2014 Korea Open.

Han made her Grand Slam main-draw debut at the 2020 Australian Open having received a wildcard.

At the 2017 Korea Open, she defeated top 50 player Kristýna Plíšková as one of her biggest victories.

Grand Slam singles performance timeline

WTA career finals

Doubles: 1 (1 title)

WTA Challenger finals

Doubles: 1 (1 title)

ITF Circuit titles

Singles: 23 (13 titles, 10 runner–ups)

Doubles: 45 (26 titles, 19 runner–ups)

Notes

References

External links
 
 
 

1992 births
Living people
South Korean female tennis players
Sportspeople from Incheon
Tennis players at the 2014 Asian Games
Universiade medalists in tennis
Tennis players at the 2018 Asian Games
Universiade gold medalists for South Korea
Universiade bronze medalists for South Korea
Asian Games competitors for South Korea
Medalists at the 2015 Summer Universiade
21st-century South Korean women